Rodriguez v. FDIC was a United States Supreme Court case (589 U.S.  (2020)) in which the court held that the precedent established as the Bob Richards Rule did not count as a legitimate exercise of federal lawmaking and thus that the rule is not to be used in decisions by federal judges.

Background
The case itself is borne out of a dispute over to whom a tax return belongs. After United Western Bank entered receivership, it was managed by the FDIC. The bank's parent company, United Western Bancorp entered into chapter 7 bankruptcy, Simon Rodriguez – the plaintiff – was named as the trustee. The dispute arose between shareholder of United Western Bancorp and Simon Rodriguez or the customers of United Western Bank and the FDIC would receive the $4.8 million tax refund issued by the IRS. In 2015, the IRS paid the income tax return filed by United Western Bancorp in 2011 to the bankruptcy court, handing the court the mandate to figure out to whom the refund is due.

Judicial Process
With the bankruptcy court given the responsibility of finding out to whom the money should be paid out, the court used a previous agreement between United Western Bancorp and United Western Bank to hold that the money should be paid to United Western Bancorp; however, this was appealed by the FDIC to a United States district court. The district court overturned the decision of the previous court with the rationale that the Bob Richard Rule which had been determined in a previous case in an appellate court, gave the money to United Western Bank as they were the entity that suffered monetary loss. Dissatisfied with the district court's ruling, Rodriguez appealed its ruling to the United States Court of Appeals for the Tenth Circuit, who upheld the district court's ruling. The plaintiff then filed a petition for a Writ of Certiorari, which was subsequently granted by the Supreme Court.

Decision
The previous judgment was vacated and the case was remanded to the Tenth Circuit to decide without considering the Bob Richards rule. The Supreme Court found that the Bob Richards rule was "not a legitimate exercise of federal common lawmaking", which went beyond the ability permitted of federal judges to "appropriately craft the rule of decision". On remand from the Supreme Court, the Tenth Circuit decided that the refund belonged to the FDIC as the Western United Bank and not Western United Bancorp. The judgment was then remanded to the bankruptcy court.

References

External links 
 
 

United States Supreme Court cases of the Roberts Court
2020 in United States case law
United States Supreme Court cases